"Bullit" is a dance song by the French music producer Laurent Arriau aka Watermät. A vocal version entitled "Bullit (So Real)" was later released, but it did not chart. The music video for Bullit is about a group of hula girls in a photograph, who use their alluring looks to invite men to join them on the beach, ultimately trapping the men in the photograph with them. The main hula girl is played by Australian model Lucinda Nicholas.

Track listing

Charts

Weekly charts

Year-end charts

Certifications

Release history

References

2014 singles
2014 songs
Polydor Records singles